Phocoenobacter is a Gram-negative and rod-shaped genus of bacteria from the family of Pasteurellaceae with one known species (Phocoenobacter uteri). Phocoenobacter uteri has been isolated from the uterus of a harbour porpoise (Phocoena phocoena) from Inverness in Scotland.

References

Further reading 
 
 

Pasteurellales
Bacteria genera
Monotypic bacteria genera